Penstemon filiformis is an uncommon species of penstemon known by the common name threadleaf beardtongue. It is endemic to the Klamath Mountains of northern California, where it grows in forest and woodland, often on serpentine soils. It is a perennial herb growing up to half a meter tall, its stem hairy and woody toward the base. The leaves are very narrow, linear and rolled to threadlike, reaching up to 7 centimeters long, those low on the plant sometimes borne in clusters. The inflorescence produces hairless, tubular or funnel-shaped blue to purple flowers just over a centimeter in length.

External links
Jepson Manual Treatment
Photo gallery

filiformis
Endemic flora of California
Flora without expected TNC conservation status